Ungod is the debut album by American industrial rock band Stabbing Westward. The album was recorded in six weeks in Chiswick, England in 1993, and released by Columbia Records on February 15, 1994. With adequate album sales and touring with the likes of Depeche Mode, a second album, Wither Blister Burn & Peel, was released in 1996. The guitar line in the chorus of the song "Ungod" was later used in Filter's song "Hey Man Nice Shot" in 1995. Stuart Zechman, who was also playing guitar for Filter at the time, took the riff and showed it to Stabbing Westward who ended up using it as well.

Reception 
In 2005, Ungod was ranked number 425 in Rock Hard magazine's book of The 500 Greatest Rock & Metal Albums of All Time.

Track listing

Personnel 
 Christopher Hall – lead vocals, guitar
 Stuart Zechman – guitar
 Jim Sellers – bass
 Walter Flakus – keyboards, programming
 David Suycott – drums

Appearances 
The "Thread Mix" of "Violent Mood Swings" was featured in the soundtrack to the 1994 film Clerks.
The song "Nothing" appeared in the movie Bad Boys in 1995, but was not featured on the official soundtrack album. The song also accompanied the end credits of the 1995 film Johnny Mnemonic and was included on the film's soundtrack, along with the song "Lost".
The songs "Lost", "Lies", and "Can't Happen Here" were included in the 1995 film Mortal Kombat, but were not included on the official soundtrack.

References 

1994 debut albums
Albums produced by John Fryer (producer)
Columbia Records albums
Stabbing Westward albums